The Samuel Cate Prescott Award has been awarded since 1964 by the Institute of Food Technologists (IFT) in Chicago, Illinois. It is awarded to food science or technology researchers who are under 36 years of age or who earned their highest degree within ten years before July 1 of the year the award is presented. This award is named for Samuel Cate Prescott (1872-1962), a food science professor from the Massachusetts Institute of Technology who was also the first president of IFT.

Award winners receive a plaque from IFT and a USD 3,000 honorarium.

Winners

References

List of past winners - Official site

Food technology awards
Awards established in 1964
1964 establishments in Illinois